Iraquara is a municipality in the state of Bahia in the North-East region of Brazil.

Geography 
Its estimated in 2020 population was 25,478 inhabitants. It lies in the center of Bahia, in the Chapada Diamantina. Tourists visit to see the caves such as: Pratinha, Lapa Doce, Torrinha, Gruta Azul, Gruta da Fumaça, among others.

See also
Chapada Diamantina
List of municipalities in Bahia
Conjunto Santa Rita 
Gruta da Torrinha
List of caves in Brazil
Chapada Diamantina National Park

References

Municipalities in Bahia